Gethosyne is a genus of moths of the family Crambidae. It contains only one species, Gethosyne aequivocalis, which is found in Meghalaya, in Northeast India. Its type locality is the Khasi Hills.

References

Spilomelinae
Taxa named by William Warren (entomologist)
Monotypic moth genera
Moths of Asia
Crambidae genera